Iolaus neavei, or Neave's sapphire, is a butterfly in the family Lycaenidae. The species was first described by Hamilton Herbert Druce in 1910. It is found in Nigeria, Cameroon, the Republic of the Congo, the Democratic Republic of the Congo, Uganda and Tanzania. The habitat consists of forests.

The larvae feed on Agelanthus krausei.

Subspecies
Iolaus neavei neavei (Nigeria: Cross River loop, Cameroon, Congo, Democratic Republic of the Congo: Uele)
Iolaus neavei katera Talbot, 1937 (Uganda: west to the western shores of Lake Victoria and the Bwamba Valley, north-western Tanzania)

Etymology
The name honours Sheffield Airey Neave.

References

External links

Die Gross-Schmetterlinge der Erde 13: Die Afrikanischen Tagfalter. Plate XIII 68 g

Butterflies described in 1910
Iolaus (butterfly)
Taxa named by Hamilton Herbert Druce